Jean-Marc Lévy-Leblond (born 1940) is a physicist and essayist.

After a doctorate in Theoretical Physics at the université d’Orsay in 1965, he was successively in charge of research at CNRS, lecturer at the université de Nice, a professor at the Paris Diderot University, and at Nice, where he taught in the departments of physics, philosophy and communication.

Since 2001, he has been Professor Emeritus at the Université de Nice and is program director at the Collège international de philosophie.
 
He has published many articles on theoretical physics, mathematics and epistemology.

He founded and directs the journal "Alliage (culture, science, technique)", directs the collection "Science ouverte" at Seuil, and works more generally for the use of science in culture.

References

French physicists
Living people
1940 births